Toma Zdravkov (born 24 May 1987 in Pazardzhik, Bulgaria) is a Bulgarian singer, most known for winning Music Idol, the Bulgarian version of the British hit show Pop Idol.

Career
His career began in 2008 when he won the Music Idol song contest;  he was the first rock singer to win it. Later this year, he released his first album, Geroi (Hero), and his first single, also called "Geroi" (a cover of Thornley's "So Far So Good"). On 4 July 2008, he opened for Def Leppard and Whitesnake.

In April 2009 Toma released his second single, "Niama Miasto V Teb" (There's No Space In You).

Discography

Geroi
Tracklist
 "Niamam Vreme"
 "Losh"
 "Geroi"
 "Inconsolable"
 "Gentulmeni" (ft. Dicho)
 "Sega Si Edna"
 "Niama Miasto V Teb"
 "Plastmasa"
 "Leden Puls"
 "Moga"
 "Every 1's A Winner" (cover of Hot Chocolate's song)

References

External links 
 Toma Zdravkov at Bulgarian Rock Archives

1987 births
Living people
People from Pazardzhik
Idols (TV series) winners
Bulgarian rock singers
21st-century Bulgarian male singers